Copsin is a fungal defensin that acts as an antimicrobial polypeptide secreted from the inky cap mushroom, first reported at the end of 2014. The fungal defensin acts against gram positive bacteria.

History

In October 2014, a collaboration of the Swiss Federal Institute of Technology, Switzerland and the University of Bonn, Germany reported, that they had identified a new antimicrobial peptide, excreted from the inky cap mushroom (Coprinopsis cinereacopsin) grown on horse dung.

Biosynthesis

The polypeptide was recombinantly produced in a yeast named Pichia pastoris which grew over five days. the peptide has an extremely compact three-dimensional structure on NMR spectroscopy.

Mechanism of action

Copsin is an inhibitor of cell wall synthesis by binding to Lipid II.
It was reported to be potent in the petri dish against Gram positive bacteria which have a cell wall, including Enterococcus faecium and Listeria monocytogenes.
It is not active against bacteria with an outer membrane, such as gram negative bacteria.

Potential use
The "exceptionally stable protein", can be boiled at 100 degrees Celsius, can be mixed in strong acid for hours, and can also survive very aggressive enzymes, " remaining completely active". It is considered for use in the food industry for food preservation.

See also
defensins
plectasin, the first fungal defensin discovered 2005

References

Polypeptide antibiotics
Defensins